Madeleine Petrovic (born 25 June 1956) is an Austrian politician. From 1994 to 1996 she was federal spokesperson of the Austrian Green Party.

She attended Austrian gymnasium which she finished 1974, and studied law at the University of Vienna, finishing in 1978. She then studied management science at the Vienna University of Economics and Business Administration, finishing in 1982. She received an additional diploma as certified interpreter for English and French.

After working as assistant and lector at the university, she was employed by the Ministry of Social Affairs.

During the first mailbomb series of Austrian terrorist Franz Fuchs, on December 5, 1993 a mailbomb targeted at her was discovered and neutralized. The same day Vienna's mayor Helmut Zilk was seriously injured by another mailbomb.

Political career
From 1986 to 1987 Petrovic was politically engaged in the Döbling Greens. 1987 she became federal state chairwoman of the Vienna Greens. In 1990 she became Member of the National Council of Austria (Nationalrat). In 1994 and 1995 she was leading candidate during the campaign to the National Council elections. From 1994 to 1996 she was federal spokesperson of the Austrian Greens. Until 1999 she was chairwoman of the parliamentary club of the Greens in the national council. Since 2001 she has been vice-spokesperson for the Austrian Greens.

Notes and references

1956 births
Living people
20th-century Austrian women politicians
20th-century Austrian politicians
21st-century Austrian women politicians
21st-century Austrian politicians
The Greens – The Green Alternative politicians
Vienna University of Economics and Business alumni
Politicians from Vienna